Washington Township is an inactive township in Dallas County, in the U.S. state of Missouri.

Washington Township was established in 1841, taking its name from President George Washington.

References

Townships in Missouri
Townships in Dallas County, Missouri